Hymenopellis radicata, commonly known as the deep root mushroom or the rooting shank, is a widespread agaric readily identified by its deeply rooted stalk (stipe).

Description 
The cap is medium to large, flat, grayish or yellowish brown and streaked, with a central hump and has a size of between 5 and 12.5 cm. The surface of the cap is sticky or slimy when moist, with the underside displaying wide white gills, or lamellae. The brittle stalk tapers at both ends and is nearly white above to brown below the soil.

The stem grows into a long deeply rooting tap root until it touches a piece of wood. This may grow up to 20 cm in length in some specimens.

Similar species 
Similar to Oudemansiella longipes.

References 

Physalacriaceae
Fungi of Europe
Fungi of North America